Abiria was the country of the Abhiras (today's Ahirs). It is mentioned in the Periplus of the Erythraean Sea and by Ptolemy in his Geographia. The Periplus mentions it as Aberia with the coastal district Syrastrene (modern-day Saurashtra, Gujarat), and Ptolemy locates it above the Indus delta.

Location
The Periplus of the Erythraean Sea and Geographia by Ptolemy locate Abiria between the lower Sindh valley and Kathiawar, apparently in southwest Rajputana and adjoining regions. In the Puranas however, the domains of the Abhira kings were located in the northwestern region of the Deccan.

Mention by Ptolemy
Abiria was mentioned by Ptolemy when he described the territory of the ksatrapa Chastana:

Mention in the Periplus of the Erythraean Sea
Abiria is also mentioned in the 1st century CE Periplus of the Erythraean Sea:

"Beyond the gulf of Baraca is that of Barygaza and the coast of the country of Ariaca, which is the beginning of the Kingdom of Nambanus and of all India. That part of it lying inland and adjoining Scythia is called Abiria, but the coast is called Syrastrene. It is a fertile country, yielding wheat and rice and sesame oil and clarified butter, cotton and the Indian cloths made therefrom, of the coarser sorts. Very many cattle are pastured there, and the men are of great stature and black in color. The metropolis of this country is Minnagara, from which much cotton cloth is brought down to Barygaza." Periplus, Chap. 41

See also
Saraostus
Abhiras
Abhira dynasty
Periplus of the Erythraean Sea

References

Empires and kingdoms of India